Hasan Pasha (also referred to as Mollacık Hasan Pasha or Kethüda Hasan Pasha; died 1700/1701) was an Ottoman statesman who served as the Ottoman governor of Egypt Eyalet (1687), Baghdad Eyalet (1687–1688, 1690–1691/92), and Shahrizor Eyalet (1591/92–1595/96). He also served as the warden of the Ottoman Sanjak of Rhodes and was a vizier.

While he was the warden of Rhodes, Hasan Pasha retired. In 1697 or 1698, his viziership was revoked, and he was exiled first to the Sanjak of Kocaeli and then to Saqqez. His viziership and warden post was restored in 1698 or 1699. He died in 1700 or 1701.

See also
 List of Ottoman governors of Egypt

References

17th-century births
1700s deaths
Ottoman governors of Egypt
Ottoman governors of Baghdad
17th-century Ottoman governors of Egypt